Dyschirius senegalensis is a species of ground beetle in the subfamily Scaritinae. It was described by Bruneau de Mire in 1952.

References

senegalensis
Beetles described in 1952